Kungsgårdens SK is a Swedish football club located in Kungsgården.

Background
Kungsgårdens SK currently plays in Division 4 Gestrikland which is the sixth tier of Swedish football. They play their home matches at the Sportvallen in Kungsgården.

The club is affiliated to Gestriklands Fotbollförbund. Kungsgårdens SK have competed in the Svenska Cupen on 2 occasions and have played 3 matches in the competition.

Season to season

Footnotes

External links
 Kungsgårdens SK – Official website
 Kungsgårdens SK Fanclub on Facebook

Football clubs in Gävleborg County